Rawlins Park is a park in the Foggy Bottom neighborhood of Washington, D.C. between the George Washington University campus and Department of the Interior. The General John A. Rawlins statue is located on the eastern end of the park. Directly north of the park is the General Services Administration. Directly south is the Department of Interior building.

Events
In September 2002 a September 11 Remembrance Ceremony was held at the park.

References

Foggy Bottom
George Washington University
Parks in Washington, D.C.